The 2000 United States Senate election in Vermont took place on November 7, 2000. Incumbent Republican U.S. Senator Jim Jeffords won re-election to a third term in office. In May 2001, Jeffords left the Republican Party and announced that he would become an independent who would caucus with the Democratic Party. His party switch broke the 50–50 lock in the Senate and effectively gave the Democrats the majority. Despite his 40-point victory, this remains the most recent congressional election in Vermont won by a Republican, and the last time as of 2022, either party won this seat.

Democratic primary

Candidates

Declared
 Ed Flanagan, Vermont Auditor of Accounts
 Jan Backus, former Vermont State Senator and 1994 Democratic nominee for the U.S. Senate

Declined
Howard Dean, Governor of Vermont

Results

Republican primary

Candidates 
 Jim Jeffords, incumbent U.S. Senator
 Rick Hubbard

Results

Independents and minor parties

Independents

Declared
Rick Hubbard

Declined
Bernie Sanders, U.S. Representative from VT-AL; former mayor of Burlington

General election 
Flanagan was widely seen as having little chance of beating the highly popular Jeffords, who was thought of as a liberal Republican. Flanagan campaigned on "shaking up Washington" and portrayed himself as a reformer. Both candidates supported same-sex civil unions and remained silent on the issue of same-sex marriage, but Flanagan, who was openly gay, noted receiving backlash from voters opposed to same-sex marriage. The LGBT community in Vermont was divided between which candidate to support, as Jeffords had been strongly supportive of LGBT rights and had received a perfect score from the Human Rights Campaign.

Endorsements

Results

See also 
 2000 United States Senate elections

Notes

References 

Vermont
2000
2000 Vermont elections